Abington railway station was a station which served Abington, in the Scottish county of South Lanarkshire. It was served by local trains on what is now known as the West Coast Main Line. There is  now no station convenient for Abington.

History

The station had two through platforms connected by a footbridge, several sidings and a goods shed, the yard was equipped with a 3 ton crane and was able to accommodate live stock, horse boxes and cattle vans.

The station was host to a LMS caravan in 1935 and 1936 and possibly one in 1937. The station closed on 4 January 1965 when the local passenger services  were withdrawn.

The station site is now the location of passing loops to enable slower trains to be overtaken, there is an engineers yard on the west side of the line.

References

Notes

Sources

Further reading

External links 
 RAILSCOT on Caledonian Railway
 Abington railway station on navigable O.S. map

Disused railway stations in South Lanarkshire
Railway stations in Great Britain opened in 1848
Railway stations in Great Britain closed in 1965
1848 establishments in Scotland
1965 disestablishments in Scotland
Beeching closures in Scotland
Former Caledonian Railway stations